Joseph Scott Barker (born June 11, 1963) is an American Episcopal clergyman, and the eleventh and current Bishop of Nebraska.

Biography 
Barker was born in Omaha, Nebraska.  He graduated from Yale College in 1985 with a Bachelor of Arts in Religious Studies, and from Berkeley Divinity School at Yale in 1992 with an Master of Divinity in Anglican Studies.  At Berkeley, he was awarded the Mersick prize for effective public address and preaching, and the Tweedy Prize for exceptional promise as a pastoral leader.
 
Barker served as Assistant to the Dean and Canon Vicar at Trinity Cathedral in Omaha from 1992 to 1997, Rector of Church of the Resurrection in Omaha from 1997 to 2002, and Rector of Christ Church in Warwick, New York from 2002 to 2011.

Barker was consecrated on October 8, 2011, in La Vista, Nebraska, and is the 1,060th bishop in the American succession.

See also
 List of Episcopal bishops of the United States
 Historical list of the Episcopal bishops of the United States

References

Berkeley Divinity School alumni
Clergy from Omaha, Nebraska
1963 births
Living people
People from Warwick, New York
Yale College alumni
Episcopal bishops of Nebraska